Common milkwort is a common name for several plants and may refer to:

Polygala sanguinea, native to eastern North America
Polygala vulgaris, native to Europe